Sindh Government Press Football Club is a Pakistani professional football club based in Karachi, Pakistan.

History 
Sindh Government Press debuted in the 1979 Inter-Departmental Championship (now PFF National Challenge Cup), the first ever edition of the Pakistan National Challenge Cup which they won after defeating Muslim Commercial Bank. In the 2004–05 PFF National League in the group "Southern". They ended up at fourth place out of seven. In the 2005–06 PFF National League, SGP were in Group A and was in second place. They qualified for the final round and they ended up second place and were in the semi-finals. However they lost their match against Pakistan Railways, ending promotion chance. They have played more than five editions of PFF League but still haven't promoted to Pakistan Premier League. In 2020, they played PFF League after six years despite they still couldn't promote.

Honours 

 Inter-Departmental Championship (now PFF National Challenge Cup) (1) 
 1979

References 

Football clubs in Pakistan
Football in Karachi
1979 establishments in Pakistan
Association football clubs established in 1979